Peter Mitchel Andrew Charleton (born 11 April 1956) is an Irish judge who has served as a Judge of the Supreme Court of Ireland since June 2014. He previously served as a Judge of the High Court from 2006 to 2014.

Early life
He was educated at St Mary's College, Dublin, Trinity College Dublin and King's Inns. He was the auditor of the College Historical Society between 1977 and 1978. His immediate predecessor was Mary Harney. He was in the final of the Irish Times Debate in 1977 and won the Benchers' Trophy for legal debate with Alex Schuster in 1979. As auditor of the CHS, his inaugural address was on the subject of "Republicanism Reviewed" and featured contributions from Conor Cruise O'Brien, John A. Murphy, Bernadette Devlin McAliskey, Mairéad Corrigan, Noël Browne and John Brooke, 2nd Viscount Brookeborough.

Legal career
He was called to the Bar in 1979, and became a senior counsel in 1995. He was the first senior counsel to appear in an Irish court without a wig, following the enactment of the Courts and Court Officers Act 1995. He was appointed to the Advisory Group on Criminal Law and Procedure in 1996 by Minister for Justice Nora Owen.

His legal practice included appearing for the Director of Public Prosecutions in criminal trials. He was prosecuting counsel in cases against Catherine Nevin for murder, and Paul Ward and John Gilligan in the Special Criminal Court for the murder of Veronica Guerin. Charleton also represented clients as a criminal defence barrister and in family law, judicial review and commercial law cases. He represented Christy Burke in a defamation action in 1996 and Eircom in a case related to the publication of a phone sex line in their telephone directory. He defended Ritchie Neville and Jason "J" Brown of the boyband 5ive following charges arising out of an altercation in Temple Bar, Dublin in 2001.

He worked as senior counsel for the Morris Tribunal into allegations of corruption in the Donegal division of the Garda Síochána. He was joined by Paul McDermott SC and Anthony Barr. He left the Morris Tribunal two years before it finished to take up an appointment to the High Court.

Charleton has also represented the State in cases before the European Court of Justice.

He is the author of a number books on criminal law and has also published on family and constitutional law, copyright, extradition and judicial review. He lectured in the King's Inns in the law of tort between 1982 and 1984, Trinity College Dublin in criminal law between 1986 and 1988, Fordham University, The University of Washington, and China University of Political Science and Law. He is also an adjunct professor of criminal law and criminology at NUI Galway and regularly delivers lectures there.

He was Chairman of the National Archives of Ireland Advisory Council from 2011 to 2016, an unpaid position.

Judicial career

High Court
He was appointed as a Judge of the High Court in December 2006, and assigned to the Commercial Court from 2010. In 2014 he criticised a firm of stockbrokers for taking risks with the personal fortune of a person with special needs. As a judge of the Central Criminal Court, in a case called The People (DPP) v WD he introduced sentencing bands for rape cases and followed this up with supervision of the Judicial Researchers Office to produce sentencing guidelines for a range of serious indictable crime.

He has also acted as an ad hoc judge of the European Court of Human Rights.

Supreme Court
He was nominated to the Supreme Court in June 2014 and appointed by President Michael D. Higgins in July 2014.

Charleton has written judgments for the Supreme Court on key aspects of criminal law. In 2016, he outlined the nature of consent in law in the context of sexual offences. He developed the substance of Irish common law defences of duress and provocation in the Gleeson and McNamara cases respectively, in both instances deploying tests using mixed standards of objective and subjective elements.

Disclosures Tribunal
In 2017, he was appointed sole member of the Disclosures Tribunal investigation into allegations of Garda Síochána malpractice. He published two substantive reports as chair of the Tribunal.

The portion of the inquiry presided over by Charleton ran from February 2017 until October 2018. In his findings from the inquiry, he found that a Garda sergeant, Maurice McCabe, had been subject to a smear campaign by the Garda Commissioner Martin Callinan and a Garda press officer, but not from subsequent Commissioner Nóirín O'Sullivan and other Gardaí. He was also critical of the Child and Family Agency in handling claims of rape.

In his concluding remarks on his findings, he criticised the Gardaí and the Child and Family Agency for not having organisational mentalities of learning from their errors. He was particularly critical of the credibility of evidence given by several senior members of the police force. Drew Harris, O'Sullivan's successor as commissioner, said on its publication that the report was "difficult reading for the organisation" and the Gardaí would move to have "an open and inclusive culture".

Subsequently, he criticised the manner in which tribunals of inquiry are conducted in Ireland. He suggested that instead of being run in a format akin to criminal trials, the main aspect of the inquiry should be directed from the tribunal itself. He later co-authored a journal article about his proposals for change.

Personal life
He is married to Fiona Daly. He has three children, Clara, Anna-Rose and Maitiú. He was a founder of the RTÉ Philharmonic Choir and a member of the board of the Irish Baroque Orchestra.

Publications

References

1956 births
Living people
Irish barristers
Judges of the Supreme Court of Ireland
Alumni of Trinity College Dublin
High Court judges (Ireland)
Alumni of King's Inns